Claude Biwer (born 15 May 1936 in Marville, Meuse) is a former member of the Senate of France, who represented the Meuse department.  He is a member of the New Centre and sat in the Senate as a member of the Centrist Union group.

References

1936 births
Living people
People from Meuse (department)
Politicians from Grand Est
Union for French Democracy politicians
Democratic Movement (France) politicians
The Centrists politicians
Deputies of the 6th National Assembly of the French Fifth Republic
French Senators of the Fifth Republic
Senators of Meuse (department)